Dog Barbos and Unusual Cross or  is a 1961 Soviet short comedy film directed by Leonid Gaidai.

Plot
A trio of petty criminals – The Coward, The Fool and The Pro go "fishing". They do not only want to eat and drink well, but they also wish to catch a fish. But the conmen do not want to sit on the beach with a fishing rod and wait patiently for a fish to bite, instead they decide to go poaching; their plan is to stun fish using dynamite! Dropping a stick with a dynamite block tied to it into the river, the crooks rub their hands in anticipation of a magnificent "catch", but ... the unruly dog Barbos interferes. The dog manages to fish out the stick of dynamite which is about to explode from the river and rushes towards the poachers! In a panic, the scoundrels run away, but Barbos chases after them, and the three men climb a tall tree. But the cunning dog throws dynamite with a burning safety fuse under a tree, runs away ... and after that there is a loud blast! Poachers who were going to blow away the fish have instead knocked themselves senseless and their clothes get tattered to shreds.

Cast
Yuri Nikulin – The Fool
Georgy Vitsin – The Coward
Yevgeny Morgunov – The Pro
Georgy Millyar – Water-bailiff (uncredited)
Leonid Gaidai – Bear in a tent (deleted scene)
Dog Bryokh – Dog Barbos

Filming
Filming took place in the vicinity of the village of Snegiri in the Istrinsky District of Moscow region, on the banks of the Istra River, and the scene with the explosion of dynamite were shot near the summer residence of Ivan Kozlovsky.
Filmed material in total was enough for a half-hour, but the director Leonid Gaidai reduced it to a ten minutes running time and removed a lot of stunt scenes that were later used in Bootleggers.
During the filming, Yuri Nikulin had huge false eyelashes applied, and the actor diligently blinked. Thus, according to the director, The Fool's face was supposed to look even more silly.

Awards
Nominated for Short Film Palme d'Or at the 1961 Cannes Film Festival.

See also
 The Loaded Dog

References

External links

1961 comedy films
1961 films
1960s chase films
Films about dogs
Films directed by Leonid Gaidai
Films set in forests
Films set in Russia
Films set in the Soviet Union
Films shot in Moscow Oblast
Films without speech
Mosfilm films
1960s Russian-language films
Soviet comedy films
Soviet short films